Periaptodes frater is a species of beetle in the family Cerambycidae. It was described by Van der Poll in 1887. It is known from the Solomon Islands, New Britain, and possibly Australia.

References

Lamiini
Beetles described in 1936